Halfa may refer to:

Halfa, Iowa, a community in the United States
Wadi Halfa, a place in Northern Sudan
New Halfa, a place in Sudan
New Halfa Airport, Sudan
Ħalfa Rock, an islet off the south-eastern coast of the island of Gozo, Malta
Battle of Alam el Halfa, a battle of World War II in North Africa
A grass also called esparto
Halfa, a supernatural creature from the Nickelodeon show, Danny Phantom